Thomas Emlyn Gwynne (fourth ¼ 1898 – fourth ¼ 1962) was a Welsh rugby union and professional rugby league footballer who played in the 1920s and 1930s.

Background
Emlyn Gwynne's birth was registered in Llanelli, Wales, and his death aged 63 was registered in West Glamorgan, Wales.

Playing career

International honours
Emlyn Gwynne won a cap for Wales (RL) while at Hull in the 15–39 defeat by England at White City Stadium, Sloper Road, Grangetown, Cardiff on Wednesday 14 November 1928, and won caps for Great Britain (RL) while at Hull in 1928 against Australia, and New Zealand, and in 1929 against Australia.

County honours
Emlyn Gwynne played , i.e. number 5, and scored a try in Glamorgan's 18–14 victory over Monmouthshire in the non-County Championship match during the 1926–27 season at Taff Vale Park, Pontypridd on Saturday 30 April 1927.

Challenge Cup Final appearances
Emlyn Gwynne played , i.e. number 5, in Hull FC's 9–10 defeat by Rochdale Hornets in the 1922 Challenge Cup Final during the 1921–22 season at Headingley Rugby Stadium, Leeds, in front of a crowd of 34,827.

References

 England & Wales, Birth/Death Indexes

External links
!Great Britain Statistics at englandrl.co.uk (statistics currently missing due to not having appeared for both Great Britain, and England)
Team – Past Players – G at swansearfc.co.uk

1898 births
1962 deaths
Footballers who switched code
Glamorgan rugby league team players
Great Britain national rugby league team players
Hull F.C. players
Mountain Ash RFC players
Rugby league players from Llanelli
Rugby league wingers
Rugby union players from Llanelli
Swansea RFC players
Wales national rugby league team players
Welsh rugby league players
Welsh rugby union players